Valley of the Temples Memorial Park is a memorial park located on the windward (eastern) side of the Hawaiian island of Oahu at the foot of the Koolau mountains, near the town of Kāneohe. Thousands of Buddhist, Shinto, Protestant and Catholic residents of Hawaii are buried in this memorial park. It was founded by Paul Trousdale in 1963.

The park features a 1968 replica of the 11th-century Phoenix Hall of the Byodo-In Buddhist temple complex in Uji, Japan. Inside the main part of the temple is a  Amida Buddha statue sitting on a gold lotus leaf.

Also on the grounds are large Catholic statues depicting the Passion of Christ, the Virgin Mary, various Catholic saints, crypts and mausoleums of some of the most influential people in Hawaii. Most notable of those interred at the mausoleums of the Valley of the Temples is Walter F. Dillingham, Hawaii entrepreneur and statesman. For a time, former Philippine President Ferdinand E. Marcos was interred at a private mausoleum overlooking the Byodo-In temple.

The Byodo-In temple was seen several times in the popular television show Lost as the estate of Sun-Hwa Kwon's father in the Season 1 episode, "House of the Rising Sun," and was later used as the backdrop for Sun and Jin-Soo Kwon's marriage in the Season 5 finale, "The Incident." The temple was also used in season two, episode seven of Magnum P.I. entitled "Tropical Madness" in 1981 and in the season eight episode "Tigers Fan" in 1987. The temple was also used in season two, episode nine of the original Hawaii Five-O series, entitled "The Singapore File," first broadcast 11/19/1969 and in the second part episode "F.O.B" Honolulu".

Images

External links
Home page

References

1963 establishments in Hawaii
Buildings and structures in Honolulu County, Hawaii
Cemeteries in Hawaii
Japanese-American culture in Hawaii
Religious buildings and structures in Honolulu County, Hawaii